This article details the Huddersfield Giants rugby league football club's 2021 season.
During the season, they will compete in the Super League XXVI and the 2021 Challenge Cup.

Super League

  

All fixtures are subject to change

League table

Challenge Cup

2021 Squad

2021 Transfers

Gains

Losses

Notes

References

External links
 

Huddersfield Giants seasons
Super League XXVI by club